

Bedwinus was a medieval Bishop of Elmham.

Bedwinus was consecrated in 673 or soon afterwards and died sometime after 693.

Notes

References

External links
 

Bishops of Elmham